Reconsider Me: The Love Songs is an album by American singer/songwriter Warren Zevon, released in 2006.  It is the first album to be released after his death in 2003.

Track listing
All songs by Warren Zevon unless otherwise noted.
"Accidentally Like a Martyr" – 3:38
"Please Stay" – 3:32
"Reconsider Me" – 3:26
"Searching for a Heart" – 4:16
"Hostage-O" – 4:05
"She's Too Good for Me" – 3:10
"Tenderness on the Block" (Jackson Browne, Zevon) – 3:54
"For My Next Trick I'll Need a Volunteer" – 3:12
"I'll Slow You Down" – 3:10
"El Amor de Mi Vida" (Jorge Calderón, Zevon) – 3:33
"Keep Me in Your Heart" (Calderón, Zevon) – 3:27
"Back in the High Life Again" (Will Jennings, Steve Winwood) – 3:11
"Don't Let Us Get Sick" – 3:12
Previously unreleased live, solo acoustic version recorded at KGSR Studios in Austin, TX, USA on December 3rd, 1999

Personnel
Warren Zevon – vocals, piano, keyboards
Waddy Wachtel – guitar
Benmont Tench – organ
Jai Winding – keyboards
Kenny Edwards – bass
Leland Sklar – bass
Russ Kunkel – drums
Don Henley – background vocals
Karla Bonoff – background vocals
Timothy B. Schmit – background vocals

References

Warren Zevon compilation albums
2006 compilation albums
Compilation albums published posthumously
Artemis Records compilation albums